Carlos VIII may refer to:

 Carlos Hugo, Duke of Parma (1930–2010)
 Archduke Karl Pius of Austria, Prince of Tuscany (1909–1953)